The royal penguin (Eudyptes schlegeli) is a species of penguin, which can be found on the sub-Antarctic Macquarie Island and adjacent islands. The International Union for Conservation of Nature (IUCN) classifies the royal penguin as near threatened. The scientific name commemorates the German zoologist Hermann Schlegel.

Description 

There is some controversy over whether royal penguins are a subspecies of macaroni penguins. Individuals of the two groups have been known to interbreed, though this is a relatively rare occurrence. Indeed, other penguins have been known to form mixed-species pairs in the wild.

They inhabit the waters surrounding Antarctica. Royals look very much like macaroni penguins, but have a white face and chin instead of the macaronis' black visage. Males are larger than females. Royal penguins breed only on Macquarie Island and, like other penguins, spend much of their time at sea, where they are assumed to be pelagic.

Breeding 
Royal penguins nest on beaches or on bare areas on slopes covered with vegetation. Like most seabirds they are colonial, nesting in scrapes on the ground up to a mile inland. The breeding season begins in September with laying following in October. Though royals typically lay two eggs, only one usually survives. The egg is kept warm by both parents for around 35 days. This is done by rotating 12-day shifts. After hatching, the male cares for the chick for 2 to 3 weeks, when the female returns with food for both of them. If the female is delayed or fails to return to the colony, the chick will die. At about one month old, the chicks begin to group together for warmth and safety. Both parents continue to feed chicks two to three times a day. When the chicks are just over two months old, they will have grown their adult plumage and will leave the colony to go to sea to feed on their own.

It is common for the mother of multiple eggs to abandon their first egg only a day before their second egg arrives. Due to this abandonment the first egg has half the chance of hatching as the second egg that was kept. The causes of this behaviour are still unclear.

Diet 

Royal penguins feed on krill, small fish, and small amounts of squid.

During breeding season, royal penguins will hunt in localized areas in conjunction to neighboring colonies. This implies a cohabitation with other colonies by sectoring off fishing areas for certain colonies, nearly eliminating resource competition.

Threats 
Royal penguins as a species are classified as least concern by the IUCN, with high risk of endangerment in the wild. Historically they were hunted for their oil; between 1870 and 1919 the government of Tasmania issuing licences for hunting them, with an average of 150,000 penguins (both royal and king) being taken each year. At the peak of the industry in 1905, the plant established on Macquarie Island was processing 2000 penguins at a time, with each penguin yielding about half a litre of oil.

Since the end of penguin hunting on Macquarie the numbers have climbed to 850,000 pairs. Before hunting started, there were three million penguins on the island (both royal and king).

References

Further reading 
 del Hoyo, J., Elliot, A., Sargatal, J., eds (1992) Handbook of the Birds of the World, Volume One Ostrich to Ducks,

External links 

 Royal penguins on PenguinWorld
 BirdLife species factsheet
 ARKive – images and movies of the royal penguin (Eudyptes schlegeli)
 Australian Antarctic Division: Unusual penguins  Contains picture of hybrid penguins and penguins with non-standard plumage
 www.pinguins.info Information about all species of penguins

royal penguin
Birds of subantarctic islands
Macquarie Island
royal penguin
Taxa named by Otto Finsch
Royal